Pawala Indian Reserve No. 5, a.k.a. Pawala 5, is an Indian reserve of the Tlowitsis Nation, at the head of Call Inlet, British Columbia.  The reserve is 1.0 ha. in size.

See also
List of Indian reserves in British Columbia

References

Indian reserves in British Columbia
Central Coast of British Columbia
Kwakwaka'wakw